John David Moody (born 21 February 1983 in Whangarei) is a New Zealand badminton player. In 2002 and 2004 he won the Fiji International, in 2005 the Ballarat Eureka International and the Waikato International, and in 2006 the North Harbour International and the Waikato International.

He represented New Zealand at the 2006 Commonwealth Games and 2008 Summer Olympics. At the Commonwealth Games, Moody reaching in to the third round in the men's singles event, quarterfinalists in the men's doubles event, and also the semi finalists in the mixed team event. He won a match in the bronze medal match against the Indian team, but his team was defeated 3–1.

At the Olympic Games in Beijing, China, Moody was defeated in the second round by Chinese player Chen Jin in straight games with the score 9–21, 11–21.

Achievements

Oceania Championships 
Men's singles

Mixed doubles

BWF International Challenge/Series 
Men's singles

Men's doubles

Mixed doubles

 BWF International Challenge tournament
 BWF International Series tournament

References

External links 
 Profile at NZCG website 
 IBF Player Profile
 
 

Living people
1983 births
Sportspeople from Whangārei
New Zealand male badminton players
Badminton players at the 2008 Summer Olympics
Olympic badminton players of New Zealand
Commonwealth Games competitors for New Zealand
Badminton players at the 2006 Commonwealth Games